In mathematics and physics, Lieb–Thirring inequalities provide an upper bound on the sums of powers of the negative eigenvalues of a Schrödinger operator in terms of integrals of the potential. They are named after E. H. Lieb and W. E. Thirring.

The inequalities are useful in studies of quantum mechanics and differential equations and imply, as a corollary, a lower bound on the kinetic energy of  quantum mechanical particles that plays an important role in the proof of stability of matter.

Statement of the inequalities

where  is the negative part of the potential . In the case  the left-hand side is simply the number of negative eigenvalues, and proofs were given independently by M. Cwikel, E. H. Lieb  and G. V. Rozenbljum. The resulting  inequality is thus also called the Cwikel–Lieb–Rosenbljum bound. The remaining critical case  was proven to hold by T. Weidl 

Lieb–Thirring constants

Semiclassical approximation
The Lieb–Thirring inequalities can be compared to the semi-classical limit.  

is derived with the constant

Weyl asymptotics and sharp constants
Numerous results have been published about the best possible constant  in  but this problem is still partly open. The semiclassical approximation becomes exact in the limit of large coupling, that is for potentials  the Weyl asymptotics

hold. This implies that . Subsequently  was also shown to hold for all  when   by A. Laptev and T. Weidl.

In the former case Lieb and Thirring conjectured that the sharp constant is given by

A complete survey of the presently best known values for  can be found in the literature.

Kinetic energy inequalities
For an anti-symmetric wave function such that

for all , the one-body density is defined as

where the sharp constant  is defined via

The inequality can be extended to particles with spin states by replacing the one-body density by the spin-summed one-body density. The constant  then has to be replaced by  where  is the number of quantum spin states available to each particle ( for electrons). If the wave function is symmetric, instead of anti-symmetric, such that

Inequality   describes the minimum kinetic energy necessary to achieve a given density  with  particles in  dimensions.

The inequality can be compared to the Sobolev inequality. M. Rumin derived the kinetic energy inequality  (with a smaller constant) directly without the use of the Lieb–Thirring inequality.

The stability of matter

(for more information, read the Stability of matter page)

The kinetic energy inequality plays an important role in the proof of stability of matter as presented by Lieb and Thirring. The Hamiltonian under consideration describes a system of  particles with  spin states and  fixed nuclei at locations  with charges .  The particles and nuclei interact with each other through the electrostatic Coulomb force and an arbitrary magnetic field can be introduced. If the particles under consideration are fermions (i.e. the wave function  is antisymmetric), then the kinetic energy inequality  holds with the constant  (not ). This is a crucial ingredient in the proof of stability of matter for a system of fermions. It ensures that the ground state energy  of the system can be bounded from below by a constant depending only on the maximum of the nuclei charges, times the number of particles,

The system is then stable of the first kind since the ground-state energy is bounded from below and also stable of the second kind, i.e. the energy of decreases linearly with the number of particles and nuclei. In comparison, if the particles are assumed to be bosons (i.e. the wave function  is symmetric), then the kinetic energy inequality  holds only with the constant   and for the ground state energy only a bound of the form  holds. Since the power  can be shown to be optimal, a system of bosons is stable of the first kind but unstable of the second kind.

Generalisations

The proof of this statement uses the diamagnetic inequality. Although all presently known constants  remain unchanged, it is not known whether this is true in general for the best possible constant.

In essence, the Lieb–Thirring inequality  gives an upper bound on the distances of the eigenvalues  to the essential spectrum  in terms of the perturbation . Similar inequalities can be proved for Jacobi operators.

References

Literature

 

Inequalities